Tamicha Renia Jackson (born April 22, 1978) is an American former women's basketball player. She earned a gold medal with the US Junior World Championship team (1996–97). She was named Kodak All-American for the Lady Techsters in 2000. Tamicha graduated from Louisiana Tech University in 2000 with a degree in Animal Biology.

Louisiana Tech statistics 

Source

USA Basketball
Jackson was named to the USA Basketball Women's Junior National Team when it was invited to the 1997 FIBA Junior World Championship (now called U19) held in Natal, Brazil. After beating Japan, the next game was against Australia, the defending champion. The USA team pulled out to a 13-point lead in the second half, but gave up the lead and lost the game 80–74. The USA rebounded with a close 92–88 victory over Cuba, helped by 23 points each from Maylana Martin and Lynn Pride. The USA then went on to beat previously unbeaten Russia. After winning the next two games, the USA faced Australia in the gold medal game. The USA team has a three-point lead late, but the Aussies hit a three-pointer with three seconds left in regulation to force overtime. Although the Aussies scored first, the USA team came back, then pulled into the lead and held on to win 78–74 to earn the gold, and the first medal for a USA team at a Junior World Championship. Jackson averaged 3.0 points per game.

References

External links
WNBA stats at basketball-reference.com

1978 births
Living people
African-American basketball players
All-American college women's basketball players
American women's basketball players
Basketball players from Dallas
Detroit Shock players
Louisiana Tech Lady Techsters basketball players
Phoenix Mercury players
Point guards
Portland Fire players
Washington Mystics players
21st-century African-American sportspeople
21st-century African-American women
20th-century African-American sportspeople
20th-century African-American women